Patrick Vahe (born April 3, 1996) is a former American football guard.

Personal life
A native of Texas, Vahe is of Tongan/Polynesian heritage.

High school career 
Playing high school football at Euless (Texas) Trinity, Vahe was ranked as the No. 4 prospect at guard and No. 79 overall among the ESPN 300.  In July 2013, he committed to play college football for the University of Texas.

College career
He played college football for the Texas Longhorns from 2015 to 2018. He appeared in 48 games for the Longhorns, including 45 games as a starter. He was named to the Outland Trophy preseason watch list in 2018.

Professional career

Baltimore Ravens
Vahe was signed by the Baltimore Ravens in May 2019, but he was released during final roster cuts on August 30, 2019.

Los Angeles Wildcats
In October, he was picked up by the Los Angeles Wildcats in the 2020 XFL Draft. He had his contract terminated when the league suspended operations on April 10, 2020.

References

1996 births
Living people
American football offensive guards
American people of Tongan descent
Baltimore Ravens players
Los Angeles Wildcats (XFL) players
People from Euless, Texas
Players of American football from Texas
Sportspeople from the Dallas–Fort Worth metroplex
Texas Longhorns football players